Murdan (also Romanized as Mūrdān, Moordan, and Mūredān; also known as Mardān) is a village in Hur Rural District, in the Central District of Faryab County, Kerman Province, Iran. At the 2006 census, its population was 81, in 20 families.

References 

Populated places in Faryab County